Sahara is a 1958 Indian Bollywood film directed by Lekhraj Bhakri. The film stars Meena Kumari in the lead role of Leela and relates her life story.

Plot 
Orphaned Leela (Meena Kumari) lives with her cruel aunt, Rangilibai (Leela Mishra); cousin, Kaushalya (Kammo); and uncle Vikram Singh (Badri Prasad). When Rangilibai arranges Kaushalya's marriage to Chhote Thakur (M. Rajan), the son of a wealthy landlord, Leela agrees to go with her as a maid as part of her dowry. But things change when the landlord rejects Kaushalya and decides to marry Leela. After marriage, Leela is accused of having a lover and is thrown out of home by her husband, who later understands his mistake as he was misled by his sister. Leela goes to Rangilibai's house, but she firmly refuses to accept her. Alone and desperate, Leela meets a distant relative named Gaman Singh (Kanhaiyalal). He takes her in to live with him and his wife, Swarupbai (Kuldip Kaur). When Leela refuses Swarupbai's demand to beg for alms, the latter blinds her with special eye-drops. Having lost her vision, a blinded Leela is led daily through the streets and is forced to sit near the steps of a temple singing and begging for alms. Soon Leela develops a loving mother-son relationship with another beggar of Swarupbai, a boy named Panna (Daisy Irani). This relationship carries the narrative forward.

Cast 
Meena Kumari ... Leela
M. Rajan ... Chhote Thakur
Daisy Irani ... Panna
Kuldip Kaur ... Swarupbai
Kanhaiya Lal ... Gaman Singh
Kammo ... Kaushaliya
Manoj Kumar ... Shyam
Leela Mishra ... Rangilibai
Badri Prasad ... Vikram Singh

Soundtrack

The music of the film was composed by Hemant Kumar.

Awards 
Meena Kumari received a Filmfare nomination for Best Actress for her performance, the only nomination for the film.

External links 

1958 films
1950s Hindi-language films
Films scored by Hemant Kumar